Santanu K. "Sandy" Baruah is an American politician from the state of Oregon and is the president and chief executive officer of the Detroit Regional Chamber.

Biography
Baruah served as President George W. Bush’s last (acting) Administrator of the Small Business Administration (SBA). In this role, he was responsible for the SBA's $18 billion small business loan portfolio.

Prior to leading the SBA, Baruah served as U.S. Assistant Secretary of Commerce. In this role he led the federal government's domestic economic development program, the Economic Development Administration (EDA), served as the Senior Advisor to Commerce Secretary Carlos M. Gutierrez regarding the 2010 Census and represented the U.S. at the Organisation for Economic Co-operation and Development (OECD) in Paris, France. Baruah led the development and implementation of the Agency's award-winning balanced scorecard.

Prior to his service in the Bush Administration, Baruah was a corporate mergers and acquisitions consultant for the Performance Consulting Group. He also served in the Administration of President George H. W. Bush (1989–1993) and was on the staff of U.S. Senator Bob Packwood (Oregon).

After leaving his most recent government service in early 2009, he was a Distinguished Fellow at the U.S. Council on Competitiveness, a Washington, D.C.–based think tank composed exclusively of corporate CEOs, university presidents and labor leaders.

Sandy K. Baruah holds a B.S. from the University of Oregon and an MBA from Willamette University's Atkinson Graduate School of Management.

In 2010, Baruah was named president and chief executive officer of the Detroit Regional Chamber.  The Detroit Regional Chamber is one of the largest regional chambers of commerce in the United States.

In 2017, Baruah was appointed to the Federal Reserve Bank of Chicago - Detroit Branch board of directors.

References

1965 births
Administrators of the Small Business Administration
American politicians of Indian descent
Living people
Oregon Republicans
Politicians from Portland, Oregon
United States Department of Commerce officials
University of Oregon alumni
Willamette University alumni
George W. Bush administration personnel
Asian conservatism in the United States